Mordellistena jucunda is a beetle in the genus Mordellistena of the family Mordellidae. It was described in 1880 by Broun.

References

jucunda
Beetles described in 1880